Henry K. Peterson (March 16, 1884 – October 7, 1966) was a justice of the Iowa Supreme Court from November 3, 1955, to June 30, 1965, appointed from Pottawattamie County, Iowa. He served as chief justice for six months.

References

1884 births
1966 deaths
Justices of the Iowa Supreme Court
Chief Justices of the Iowa Supreme Court
20th-century American judges